(born February 8, 1944) is a former professional baseball outfielder who played his entire career with the Yomiuri Giants from 1962 to 1981.

A speedy switch-hitter, he won the Japan Series Most Valuable Player Award in 1966, after he hit .565 with 13 hits in the 1966 Japan Series. With 579 career stolen bases, Shibata is third on the all-time Nippon Professional Baseball list. With more than 2,000 career hits, Shibata is a member of Meikyukai, otherwise known as the Golden Players Club.

External links
Baseball-Reference

1944 births
Living people
Japanese baseball players
Nippon Professional Baseball outfielders
Yomiuri Giants players
Japanese baseball coaches
Nippon Professional Baseball coaches